Benoît Mondou (born May 3, 1985) is a Canadian professional ice hockey player who is currently playing for HC La Chaux-de-Fonds of the Swiss-B  league. He was selected by the Boston Bruins in the 8th round (247th overall) of the 2003 NHL Entry Draft.

Playing career

Junior
Mondou as born in Sorel-Tracy, Quebec. He played Major junior hockey in the QMJHL with the Baie-Comeau Drakkar and Shawinigan Cataractes. During the 2001–02 QMJHL season, Mondou was an offensive force with the Drakkar, scoring 70 points to set the team's single season for most points by a rookie. That same season he won the Michel Bergeron Trophy as the  QMJHL's Offensive Rookie of the Year, the RDS Cup as the QMJHL's overall Rookie of the Year, and was named to the QMJHL's All-Rookie team.

He joined the Cataractes midway during the 2002–03 season. Between the two teams he was able to post respectable numbers during his second year,  scoring 11 goals and 62 points in 60 games. On June 21, 2003, Mondou was selected in the 2003 NHL Entry Draft as a late round pick (247th overall) of the Boston Bruins.

Mondou's showed his offensive abilities again during the 2003–04 QMJHL season when he led the Cataractes in scoring with 95 points (5th best in the QMJHL). That year he was awarded the Frank J. Selke Memorial Trophy (most sportsmanlike player in the QMJHL) and also won the CHL Sportsman of the Year award.

Professional
The Boston Bruins failed to sign Mondou to a contract, and on July 24, 2006 the New Jersey Devils signed the free agent to a minor league contract and assigned him to play the 2006–07season with the Trenton Devils in the ECHL.

Mondou broke into the AHL the following year, playing 51 games for the Lowell Devils during the 2007–08 AHL season.

The 2006–07 season began with promise, but after just 12 games in the AHL Mondou was again assigned to play in the ECHL. On December 30, 2008, after just five games with Trenton, Mondou signed with EC VSV to finish the 2008–09 season in the Austrian hockey league.

Mondou moved to La Chaux-de-Fonds,  Switzerland for the 2009–10 season to play for HC La Chaux-de-Fonds in the Swiss-B league. He continues to play for this team in the 2015-16 season.

Career statistics

Awards
QMJHL

CHL

References

External links

Benoit Mondou's profile at Elite Prospects

1985 births
Baie-Comeau Drakkar players
Boston Bruins draft picks
EC VSV players
Ice hockey people from Quebec
Living people
Lowell Devils players
Sportspeople from Sorel-Tracy
Shawinigan Cataractes players
Trenton Devils players
Canadian ice hockey right wingers